Elections to the French National Assembly were held in Upper Volta on 17 June 1951, as part of the wider French elections. The Voltaic Union (UV) won three of the four seats, which were taken by Joseph Conombo, Henri Guissou, Mamadou Ouédraogo, whilst Nazi Boni won the other seat on the Economic and Social Action in the Interests of Upper Volta list, although he remained a member of the UV.

Results

References

Upper Volta
1951 in French Upper Volta
Elections in Burkina Faso